Sir John Roy Sambles  (born 1945) is an English experimental physicist and a former President of the Institute of Physics.

Sambles, originally from Callington in Cornwall, studied physics at Imperial College, London, gaining his BSc and PhD degrees there, and has since published over 550 papers in international journals. He was elected a Fellow of the Royal Society in May 2002.

Sambles is currently Professor of Experimental Physics at the University of Exeter, he has a long and distinguished career researching the interaction of light with matter. His group at Exeter have studied a wide range of systems including: liquid crystal devices; iridescent butterfly wings; surface plasmons and microwave photonics. These studies have applications in liquid crystal displays for televisions and computer displays, highly sensitive detection of materials (e.g. for medical diagnosis), and optical and microwave communication.

In 2008, he was appointed to the Engineering and Physical Sciences Research Council.

Sambles was knighted in the 2020 Birthday Honours for services to scientific research and outreach.

He had 3 children with his wife Sandy Sambles, they had Nena Sambles now (Nena Yendell) Ivan Sambles and Gavin Sambles. They now have 6 grandchildren. Nena and her husband have Matthew and Daniel Yendell, Ivan and his wife have Anna and Libby Sambles, Gavin and his wife have Thomas and Millie.

Sambles is a Methodist local preacher and has served in that capacity for over 30 years, preaching in the Ringsash Methodist Circuit in Mid Devon.

Edited books
 1998: (edited with Steve Elston) The Optics of Thermotropic Liquid Crystals. London: Taylor & Francis

Awards
 1998 - the George William Gray medal of the British Liquid Crystal Society.
 2002 - Elected as a Fellow of the Royal Society.
 2003 - Young Medal and Prize,  for distinguished research in the field of optics presented by the Institute of Physics.
 2012 - Faraday Medal and Prize, "For his pioneering research in experimental condensed matter physics."

References

External links
 Google scholar List of papers by JR Sambles
 The homepage of Professor Roy Sambles' Research Group
 Staff Biography at the University of Exeter

Living people
People from Callington, Cornwall
English physicists
Academics of the University of Exeter
Fellows of the Institute of Physics
Presidents of the Institute of Physics
Fellows of the Royal Society
Knights Bachelor
Alumni of Imperial College London
Methodist local preachers
1945 births